Víctor Hugo García Hernández (born 11 June 1994) is a Venezuelan professional footballer who plays for Portuguese club Moreirense F.C. as a right-back.

Club career

Early years and Porto
Born in Cúa, Miranda, García spent three years in the Venezuelan Primera División with Real Esppor, being at the time the youngest player to appear for them in the competition. In early 2013, he signed with Portuguese club FC Porto to complete his development. He mas mainly registered with the latter's reserves during his tenure, notably contributing 41 matches in the 2015–16 season as they won the LigaPro championship, being however ineligible for promotion.

García made his debut for Porto's first team on 13 April 2014, playing the full 90 minutes in a 3–1 Primeira Liga away win against S.C. Braga. For the 2016–17 campaign he was loaned to fellow top-flight side C.D. Nacional, featuring regularly but suffering relegation.

Vitória Guimarães
On 28 August 2017, García joined Vitória S.C. on a four-year contract. He played 13 matches in his first season in Minho, helping to a ninth-place finish.

García was loaned to second-tier team F.C. Famalicão on 21 January 2019.

Alcorcón
On 17 September 2020, García signed a two-year deal with AD Alcorcón of the Spanish Segunda División.

International career
A former youth international, García won his first full cap for Venezuela on 10 August 2011 at the age of only 17, playing the last minutes of the 2–0 friendly loss to Honduras held in Fort Lauderdale, Florida.

Honours
Porto B
LigaPro: 2015–16

References

External links

1994 births
Living people
People from Cúa
Venezuelan footballers
Association football defenders
Venezuelan Primera División players
Real Esppor Club players
Primeira Liga players
Liga Portugal 2 players
FC Porto B players
FC Porto players
C.D. Nacional players
Vitória S.C. players
F.C. Famalicão players
Moreirense F.C. players
Segunda División players
AD Alcorcón footballers
Venezuela under-20 international footballers
Venezuela international footballers
Venezuelan expatriate footballers
Expatriate footballers in Portugal
Expatriate footballers in Spain
Venezuelan expatriate sportspeople in Portugal
Venezuelan expatriate sportspeople in Spain